The American Library Association is a professional society for librarians and some other information service providers. Its awards program includes "Books, Print & Media Awards"; professional recognition within the library sciences; and scholarships, fellowships and grants. Some of the former are annual book awards with great public visibility.

Book, print and media awards
Key
 Award: Name of the award or list
 First: Year the honor was inaugurated (first awarded) 
 Two years such as "1958 –1966" signify the honor has been discontinued and was last awarded in the latter year.
 Type: one of {Book, Career, Media, Print, Professional}
 Admin.: ALA Division responsible for the award
 Class: one of the following, if any
 Recommended lists ("Best of ...") = lists of multiple recommended works
 Youth Media Awards = honoring work(s) for children or young adults and/or their creators
 Libraries and librarianship = honoring work about libraries, etc.
 Mo.: Month of announcement

Grants and fellowships

 ALA Grants and Fellowship awards.

Professional recognition awards

ALA Professional Recognition awards.

James Madison Award — administered by the Office for Government Relations, from 1989 annually honoring "individuals or groups who have championed, protected and promoted public access to government information and the public's right to know at the national level"

AIA/ALA Library Building Awards — co-sponsored by the American Institute of Architects, honoring excellence in library architecture and design

Scholarships

ALA Scholarships.

See also

Notes

References

External links
  ALA Awards Program

ALA